Stenalia inconstans is a beetle in the genus Stenalia of the family Mordellidae. It was described in 1871 by Fåhraeus.

References

inconstans
Beetles described in 1871